The 1995 Men's EuroHockey Nations Championship was the seventh edition of the Men's EuroHockey Nations Championship, the quadrennial international men's field hockey championship of Europe organized by the European Hockey Federation. It was held in Dublin, Ireland from 16 to 27 August 1995.

The defending champions Germany won a record-extending fourth title by defeating the Netherlands 9–8 in penalty strokes after the match finished 2–2 after extra time. England won the bronze medal by defeating Belgium 2–1.

Preliminary round

Pool A

Pool B

Classification round

Ninth to twelfth place classification

9–12th place semi-finals

Eleventh place game

Ninth place game

Fifth to eighth place classification

5–8th place semi-finals

Seventh place game

Fifth place game

First to fourth place classification

Semi-finals

Third place game

Final

Final standings

See also
1995 Women's EuroHockey Nations Championship

References

Men's EuroHockey Nations Championship
EuroHockey Nations Championship
International field hockey competitions hosted by Ireland
International sports competitions in Dublin (city)
EuroHockey Nations Championship
Field hockey at the Summer Olympics – Men's European qualification
1990s in Dublin (city)
EuroHockey Nations Championship